Erlend Kaasa (born 8 July 1976) is a Norwegian novelist.

Publishing on Samlaget, he issued the novels Thunder Road (2009), Livius (2015) and Men ikkje Maria (2019). Thunder Road was set in the 1990s and was reviewed in several newspapers. He hails from Vinje and resides in Indre Arna.

References

1976 births
Living people
People from Vinje
Norwegian novelists
Nynorsk-language writers